Eelam War IV is the name given to the fourth phase of armed conflict between the Sri Lankan military and the separatist Liberation Tigers of Tamil Eelam (LTTE). Renewed hostilities began on the 26 July 2006, when Sri Lanka Air Force fighter jets bombed several LTTE camps around Mavil Aru anicut. The government's casus belli was that the LTTE had cut off the water supply to surrounding paddy fields in the area. Shutting down the sluice gates of the Mavil Aru on July 21 depriving the water to over 15,000 people - Sinhalese and Muslim settlers under Sri Lankan state-sponsored colonisation schemes  in Trincomalee district. They were denied of water for drinking and also cultivating over 30,000 acres of paddy and other crops. The fighting resumed after a four-year ceasefire between the Government of Sri Lanka (GoSL) and LTTE. Continued fighting led to several territorial gains for the Sri Lankan Army, including the capture of Sampur, Vakarai and other parts of the east. The war took on an added dimension when the LTTE Air Tigers bombed Katunayake airbase on March 26, 2007, the first rebel air attack without external assistance in history.

Eelam War IV ended on 18 May 2009 with the Sri Lanka Army gaining control of the last bit of territory held by the LTTE and with the death of the LTTE leader Velupillai Prabhakaran. The final few days of the war near Nandikadal Lagoon in the north east of the island saw very heavy fighting and led to Sri Lankan forces being accused of war crimes, which were denied by the government. Some 300,000 Tamil civilians who were trapped inside the war zone and prevented from escaping by the LTTE were caught in the crossfire during the final phase of the war.

Peace process 2002
The elections held on 5 December 2001 saw a sweeping victory for the United National Front, led by Ranil Wickremasinghe, who campaigned on a pro-peace platform and pledged to find a negotiated settlement to the conflict.

On 19 December, amidst efforts by Norway to bring the government and the Tamil Tigers to the negotiating table, the LTTE announced a 30-day ceasefire with the Sri Lankan government and pledged to halt all attacks against government forces.  The new government welcomed the move, and reciprocated it 2 days later, announcing a month-long ceasefire and agreeing to lift a long-standing economic embargo on rebel-held territory.

Signing of MoU
The two sides formalized a Memorandum of Understanding (MoU) on February 22, 2002 and signed a permanent ceasefire agreement (CFA). Norway was named mediator, and it was decided that they, together with the other Nordic countries, monitor the ceasefire through a committee of experts named the Sri Lanka Monitoring Mission. In August, the government agreed to lift the ban on the LTTE and paved the way for the resumption of direct negotiations with the LTTE.

Following the signing of the ceasefire agreement, commercial air flights to Jaffna began and the LTTE opened the key A9 highway, which linked government controlled area in the south with Jaffna and ran through LTTE territory, allowing civilian traffic through the Vanni region for the first time in many years. Many foreign countries also offered substantial financial support if peace was achieved and optimism grew that an end to the decades long conflict was in sight.

The much anticipated peace talks began in Sattahip Naval Base, Chonburi Province, Thailand on the September 16 and 5 further rounds followed in Rose Garden, Nakhorn Pathom Province,  Norway and Berlin, Germany. During the talks, both sides agreed to the principle of a federal solution and the Tigers dropped their long standing demand for separate state. This was a key compromise from the LTTE, which had always insisted on an independent Tamil state and it also represented a compromise from the government, which had seldom agreed to more than minimal devolution. Both sides also exchanged prisoners of war for first time.

Beginning of the war
A new crisis leading to the first large-scale fighting since signing of the ceasefire occurred in 2006 when the LTTE closed the sluice gates of the Mavil Aru reservoir on July 21 and cut the water supply to 15,000 villages in government controlled areas. After initial negotiations and efforts by the SLMM to open the gates failed, the Air Force attacked LTTE positions on July 26, and ground troops began an operation to open the gate. Palitha Kohona, a government spokesman, stated that the government remained committed to the cease-fire. Likewise, the LTTE also claimed that they were committed to the ceasefire

The sluice gates were eventually reopened on August 8, with conflicting reports as to who actually opened them. Initially, the SLMM claimed that they managed to persuade the LTTE to lift the waterway blockade conditionally. However a government spokesman said that "utilities could not be used as bargaining tools" by the rebels and government forces launched fresh attacks on LTTE positions around the reservoir. These attacks prompted condemnation from SLMM Chief of Staff, who stated "(The government) have the information that the LTTE has made this offer." "It is quite obvious they are not interested in water. They are interested in something else." The LTTE then claimed they opened the sluice gates "on humanitarian grounds". Eventually, following heavy fighting with the rebels, government troops gained full control of the Mavil Aru reservoir on August 15.

War in east

The war between LTTE and Sri Lankan government started after the failure of Norway brokered cease fire on July 21, 2006, when LTTE cut off the water supply to the rice growing fields in the Mavil aru area in eastern Trincomalee district. The government military claimed the total control of the eastern province after capturing the Thoppigala (Baron's cap) on July 11, 2007 following nearly a year of fighting.

The TMVP contested Batticaloa district local council election on March 10, 2008 and won all 9 councils with a high majority 70% of votes. The party also contested in Eastern Provincial Council election May 10, 2008 under the ruling UPFA banner and UPFA won the election. TMVP's current leader Sivanesathurai Chandrakanthan sworn as the Chief Minister of Eastern Provincial Council on May 16, 2008.

Political situation in North and East
Karuna has also been accused of gross human rights violations such as forming death squads, harassing journalists, extrajudicial killings, abductions, and the use of child soldiers against the LTTE. Apart from that his group has split due to alleged financial corruption issues. Karuna, with the help of the Government of Sri Lanka, was smuggled into Great Britain for refuge. He was later arrested by British authorities for illegal entry and is being probed for war crimes.

Sri Lanka pulls out of ceasefire
On January 2, 2008, The Sri Lankan government unanimously decided to formally withdraw from the ceasefire with the separatist Tamil Tiger rebels, which had existed only on paper over the past two years. Prime Minister Ratnasiri Wickramanayake had proposed that the cabinet annul the truce after yet another bomb blast went off on January 2 in the capital, Colombo, killing five and injuring over 28.

"The Government of Sri Lanka yesterday (3rd January 2008) formally notified the Norwegian Government of its decision to terminate the Agreement on a “Ceasefire (CFA) between the Government of the Democratic Socialist Republic of Sri Lanka and the Liberation Tigers of Tamil Eelam” concluded on 22nd February 2002. This notification was in terms of Article 4:4 of this Agreement and will take effect 14 days from the date of this notice i.e. 16th January 2008.
Accordingly, the Status of Mission Agreement (SOMA) on the Establishment and the Management of the Sri Lanka Monitoring Mission (SLMM) dated 18th March 2002 between the Royal Norwegian Government and the Government of the Democratic Socialist Republic of Sri Lanka will also stand terminated with effect from 16th January 2008."

This was amidst the demands of the defense secretary Gotabhaya Rajapaksa on December 29, 2007. Donor countries such as the United States, Canada, and Norway have shown deep regrets on this decision by the Sri Lankan government. Neighboring India has also shown is dismay of Sri Lanka's abrogation of the ceasefire

War in north

Meanwhile, in the north of the country, some of the bloodiest fighting since 2001 took place after the LTTE launched massive attacks on Sri Lanka Army defence lines in the Jaffna peninsula on August 11. The LTTE used a force of 400 to 500 fighters in the attacks which consisted of land and amphibious assaults, and also fired a barrage of artillery at government positions, including the key military airbase at Palali. Initially, the Tigers broke through army defense lines around Muhamalai, and advanced further north, but they were halted after 10 hours of fierce fighting. Isolated battles continued over the next few days, but the LTTE was forced to give up its offensive due to heavy casualties.

Sporadic fighting in the North has been going on for months, but the intensity of the clashes has increased since September 2007. During clashes in the Forward Defence Lines, separating their forces, both sides exchange heavy artillery fire, after which military incursions follow. By December 22, 2007 the LTTE defences at Uyilankulama and Thampanai were lost to advancing troops of the Sri Lanka Army. On December 29, 2007 the Army overran the LTTE stronghold at Parappakandal, Mannar.

In an interview with the 'Sunday Observer' the Sri Lankan Army  Commander Lt. Gen. Sarath Fonseka said that the Army had occupied the LTTE's Forward Defence Lines and surrounded the Wanni LTTE bases from all directions. He also said that there are around 3,000 Tigers remaining and that the military targets to annihilate them within the first six months of 2008. A day later there were less optimistic statements by Army, Air Force and Navy Commanders.   Lt. Gen. Fonseka's believed it was possible to defeat the LTTE in 2008.

The military of Sri Lanka claims that the leader of the LTTE Velupillai Prabhakaran was seriously injured during air strikes carried out by the Sri Lanka Air Force on a bunker complex in Jayanthinagar on November 26, 2007. Earlier, on November 2, 2007 S. P. Thamilselvan, who was the head of the rebels' political wing, was killed during another government air raid. The Sri Lanka Air Force has openly vowed to destroy the entire leadership of the LTTE. On January 5, 2008 Col. Charles, Head of LTTE Military Intelligence, was killed in claymore ambush by a suspected Sri Lanka Army Deep Penetration Unit according to a Pro-LTTE website.

Before the government offensive, the war in the Northern front was in a stalemate due to the unique topology of the two major Forward Defence Lines, The Nagarcoil FDL and The Muhamalai FDL.

Capture of Mannar District
On 2 August 2008 the Sri Lankan army captured the town of Vellankulam which was the last bastion of Tigers in the Mannar district. This marked the capture of the entire Mannar district by the Army which took eight months.

Battles at sea

On March 22, 2008, a Navy fast attack boat was destroyed after it hit a suspected sea mine laid by Tamil Tiger rebels off the country's north-east coast.

As one of the turning point of the Eelam War IV, Sri Lanka Navy ships destroyed 8 LTTE floating warehouses which carried 100,000 each of 122, 130 and 155mm Artillery Ammunition and 60mm and 81mm Mortar Ammunitions. This was the first time Sri Lanka Navy conduct a mission in 4000 km deep into the International sea.

The air war
The battle in air is significant for both sides (GoSL and LTTE) in this phase of war. The Sri Lankan Air Force used its attack aircraft to carry out a bombing campaign against identified LTTE targets. The LTTE Air Tigers also used its light aircraft to carry out bombing on the Sri Lankan military.

Major air strikes of SLAF
 On August 14, 2006 the SLAF bombed a facility in the rebel-held Mullaitivu area. The LTTE claimed 61 girls were killed, the SLMM stated they were able to count just 19 bodies. The government claimed that it was an LTTE training facility and that the children were LTTE child soldiers, although the LTTE claimed the victims were schoolgirls attending a course on first aid at an orphanage. A team from UNICEF and the Swedish-led Sri Lanka Monitoring Mission (SLMM) visited the bombed site and said they had found no evidence to support claims the rebels had been using the facility as a military training centre.
 On May 7, 2007 at about 0725 supersonic fighter jets of the SLAF bombed a strategic LTTE base and a large fuel storage at Ramanatpuram East of Iranamadu.
 In November 2007, Thamilselvan, along with five other high ranking Tamil rebels were killed by a precision air strike carried out by the SLAF on an undisclosed location near the rebels's stronghold town of Kilinochchi.

LTTE air strikes

 LTTE air strikes occurred for the first time in history on March 26, 2007 on a SLAF base at Katunayake, killing three Air Force personnel and wounding several.
 LTTE aircraft attacked Palali military complex by dropping bombs on April 23, 2007, killing six soldiers and wounding 13.
 The LTTE attacked Katunayake air base for the second time on April 26, 2007, one month after their first attack on the same location.
 in the early hours of April 29, 2007, LTTE aircraft bombed two fuel tanks at Kolonnawa and Muthurajawela close to Colombo.

Palali raid

On April 23, the Air Tigers conducted their second raid. One aircraft flew toward the Palali Air Base near Jaffna, which is the main military complex in the region. Anti‐aircraft fire prevented the aircraft from bombing the runways, but it instead dropped its bombs on a nearby military bunker, killing six soldiers.

Colombo raids

On April 26, Sri Lanka’s air defenses in Colombo fired into the sky following reports that unidentified aircraft had been spotted on radar. No attack was reported.

However, a few days later on the early morning of April 29, while the entire nation was watching the Cricket World Cup Final a Tiger aircraft bombed two fuel storage facilities outside Colombo. Chaos followed and electricity in the capital was shut off for nearly an hour. There were no casualties and minimal damage. The security forces were unable to bring down the aircraft prompting much criticism from the public and opposition political parties.

Although the government played down the attack, Shell's Sri Lankan country director, Hassan Madan, told the AFP "There was big damage to our fire-fighting facility and we estimate it will cost us in excess of 75 m rupees ($700,000) to put things back".

According to the Ministry of Defence, the assault started at around 3:20am, with LTTE ground forces attacking the airbase and overrunning key positions, including an anti-aircraft position, before Air Tiger ultralights dropped bombs on government positions. This resulted in the destruction of eight aircraft and damage to several others. The attack only affected the SLAF's training element.

The conclusion of the war

On 19 May 2009, the Sri Lankan military effectively concluded its 26-year operation against the LTTE. The 58 Division of the Sri Lankan Army led by Brig. Shavendra Silva, 59 Division led by Brig. Prasanna de Silva and the 53 Division commanded by Gen. Kamal Gunaratne, after having boxed in the remaining LTTE cadres into a small area of territory near Nandhikkadal lagoon, linked up and eliminated the remaining cadres. This final battle claimed the lives of several top LTTE leaders, including Jeyam, Bhanu, Lawrence, Pappa, Laxamanan, Balasingham Nadesan, Pottu Amman, Soosai and Velupillai Prabhakaran who was reported to have attempted to flee. On the morning of the 19th, soldiers of the 4th Vijayabahu infantry regiment led by Lt. Col Rohitha Aluvihare claimed to have found the body of Prabhakaran, and so militarily ending a separatist war that had defined Sri Lanka's history for three decades.

On 22 May 2009, Sri Lankan Secretary of Defence Gotabhaya Rajapaksa confirmed that 6,261 personnel of the Sri Lankan Armed Forces had lost their lives and 29,551 were wounded during Eelam War IV since July 2006. Brig. Udaya Nanayakkara added that approximately 22,000 LTTE cadres had died during this time.

Chronology of towns captured by the government of Sri Lanka

Killings of LTTE Leaders

 Velupillai Prabhakaran was killed by government troops. His body was identified through DNA testing on May 19, 2009.
 Soosai, leader of the Sea Tigers, and Pottu Amman, head of the LTTE intelligence wing, were killed along with Prabhakaran.
 Charles Anthony was confirmed dead on May 18, 2009. SL Army has confirmed that the body found in Vellamullivaikkal is that of LTTE chief's son.
 Three bodies recovered by SL troops have been identified as those of Nadesan, Puleethevan and Ramesh on May 18, 2009.

Assassinations 
 Sri Lankan Foreign Minister Lakshman Kadirgamar, a Tamil who was highly respected by foreign diplomats and who had been sharply critical of the LTTE, was assassinated at his home on August 12, 2005, allegedly by an LTTE sniper. His assassination led to the marginalisation of the LTTE from the international community.
 The assassination of a well renowned Tamil diplomat,  the Deputy Peace Secretariat General for Co-ordinating the Peace Process (SCOPP) Kethesh Loganathan on August 12, 2006 at Dehiwala by shooting at around 9:30pm. He had been very keen to bring peace to the country and also participated in Thimphu peace talks in 1980s. Rajapakse condemned the murder and blamed the LTTE. 
 The assassination of the head Priest of the Santhiveli Pilleyar Kovil Selliah Parameswaran Kurukkal on February 7, 2007 in his home Batticaloa. The LTTE and the Sri Lankan Government blamed each other for this murder. TULF leader V. Anandasangaree also blamed the LTTE
 UNP Parliamentarian T. Maheshwaran. Government paramilitaries were blamed 
 A roadside bomb killed Non-cabinet Nation Building Minister D. M. Dassanayake on January 8, 2008 at Ja-Ela town, located 19 km north of Colombo city.
 A suspected LTTE suicide bomber killed cabinet Minister of Highways & Road Development Jeyaraj Fernandopulle on April 6, 2008 at Weliveriya Gampaha district.
 The 12-year-old son of Velupillai Prabhakaran was executed in May 2009.

Impact of war into civilian life
Amnesty International has also stated that increasing violence was forcing many Sri Lankans to flee the country and that more than 2,800 people had sought shelter in India this year. The state's failure to provide adequate security and to ensure that attacks against civilians are prosecuted has resulted in widespread fear and panic. Amnesty international also accused the LTTE of breaking the international law by using civilians as buffers against the army. A researcher for the organisation stated that there were cases where militants had forced people to stay in rebel-held areas to hamper army operations. The United Nations reported more than 20,000 civilians were killed in this recent war. CNN report

Since the upsurge in violence in April, nearly 40,000 people were displaced. This came amidst the government's air strikes on civilian areas in the East. Amnesty International quoted UN figures to say that a total of 39,883 people had been displaced in the north and east since April 7 adding that a total of 314,378 people were displaced by the conflict while around 325,000 people were estimated to have been displaced by the tsunami.

After the International Council of Red Cross, doctors and government officials left the war zone, only the Catholic priests remained with people until the end. One of the priests, Rev. Fr. Mariampillai Sarathjeevan who was leading the refugees to safety, also died in the war zone. The people and the priest did not have food for five days, and exhausted by months of hardship. Unconfirmed reports indicate that the priest was assaulted by soldiers when he approached them for help.

Stephen Rapp, the U.S. ambassador at large for war crimes issues, called for war crimes investigation on October 2009. His department submitted a detailed report to Congress about the incidents happened during the recent conflict in Sri Lanka.  On October 25, 2009 The Office of the High Commissioner for Human Rights of the United Nations called for an  independent, international investigation of possible war crimes committed during the last few months of the war in Sri Lanka. Internal Displacement Monitoring Center of the Norwegian Refugee Council reported that the government of Sri Lanka was holding nearly 300,000 displaced people in military-run internment camps under questionable humanitarian conditions.

See also
 Eastern Theater of Eelam War IV
 Northern Theater of Eelam War IV

Eelam War I
Eelam War II
Eelam War III

References

56. Recapture Of Poonaryn by SL Army : http://news.bbc.co.uk/1/hi/world/south_asia/7730850.stm

External links
 Ministry of Defence, Sri Lanka
 Interactive Defence Map of Sri Lanka, explains current progress of the battle fronts visually.
 GoSL Peace Secretariat
 LTTE Peace Secretariat
 Sri Lanka Monitoring Mission
 Lanka Academic, news site sponsored by Sri Lankan academics worldwide
 Sangam.org
 Texts of key agreements in the peace process and an analysis of the process by Conciliation Resources
 Report on the Sri Lankan peace process by Asiafoundation
 hWeb - Sri Lanka’s recent history of ethnic conflict and political crisis originates from its colonial legacy
 NorthEast Secretariat report on Human rights 1974-2004
 hWeb - Sri Lanka’s recent history of ethnic conflict originates from its colonial legacy
 Peace&War: Humanity Ashore Pictorial
 Final Conflict Zone Maps

 
Phases of the Sri Lankan Civil War
2000s in Sri Lanka
2000s conflicts
Counterterrorism in Sri Lanka
Guerrilla wars
Tamil Eelam
History of Sri Lanka (1948–present)
Military history of Sri Lanka
2006 in Sri Lanka
2007 in Sri Lanka
2008 in Sri Lanka
2009 in Sri Lanka
Sri Lankan Civil War